The Cabinet of the state of Andhra Pradesh, India, forms the executives branch of the Government of Andhra Pradesh.

The State Cabinet of Andhra Pradesh was sworn in on 8 June 2014. A total of 15 ministers with N. T. Rama Rao taking charge as the Chief Minister of Andhra Pradesh.

Council of ministers
In 1984 cabinet was reshuffled

References

Andhra Pradesh ministries